Madavoor  is a village in Kozhikode district of Kerala, India.

Demographics
As per the census of India, Madavoor had a population of 25,358 of which 12,607 were males and 12,751 were females.

Economy
Agriculture is the main source of livelihood for the inhabitants of this village.

Notable institutions
Madavoor CM Makham
CM Centre
IFER Academy

Notable persons
Abdul Azeez Madani (1950–2022)
Hussain Madavoor

Transportation
This village connects to other parts of India through Calicut city on the west and Thamarassery town on the east.  National highway No.66 passes through Kozhikode and the northern stretch connects to Mangalore, Goa and Mumbai.  The southern stretch connects to Cochin and Trivandrum.  The eastern National Highway No.54 going through Adivaram connects to Kalpetta, Mysore and Bangalore. The nearest airports are at Kannur and Kozhikode.  The nearest railway station is at Kozhikode.

References

Thamarassery area
Panchayats in Koduvally Block